Bryan Ellis Burwell (August 4, 1955 – December 4, 2014) was an American sportswriter and author. He joined the St. Louis Post Dispatch in 2002, after leaving HBO's Inside the NFL, where he worked as a sports correspondent. Burwell also worked in radio as a co-host on CBS Sports 920 in St. Louis, Missouri, on weekday afternoons and as on-air talent at 101 ESPN Radio, also in St. Louis. Burwell was featured on two ESPN programs, Jim Rome is Burning and The Sports Reporters.

Burwell co-wrote and hosted a documentary on the baseball's Negro leagues titled, The Color of Change. He recounted, in the documentary, the trials and tribulations of the baseball league built by racism and its ultimate demise. The documentary featured interviews with Buck O'Neil, Jackie Joyner-Kersee and Hall of Famer Ozzie Smith for the St. Louis Post Dispatch.

Burwell died at the age of 59 on December 4, 2014 from melanoma, a type of cancer, leaving behind a wife, Dawnn and daughter, Victoria. Burwell was a native of Washington D.C, but raised in Lanham, Maryland. He attended Duval High School and is a 1977 graduate of Virginia State University where he pledged Kappa Alpha Psi fraternity.

Awards and recognition 

 2007 Associated Press Sports Editors named Burwell as one of the Top 10 sports columnists
 2013 Eppy Award in recognition of his video-series Upon Further Review
 2015 Burwell was posthumously elected to the U.S. Basketball Writers Association Hall of Fame, Burwell was the first African-American to be inducted into the organization's Hall of Fame. 
2015 NABJ Legacy Award in recognition for having had a career of extraordinary achievement, which broke barriers and blazed trails

Bibliography 

 At the Buzzer! Havlicek Steals, Erving Soars, Magic Deals, Michael Scores!, Doubleday, 2001
Busch Stadium: The First Season, By Joe Strauss, Rick Hummel, Bryan Burwell, etal., St.Louis Post-Dispatch, 2006
 The Best St. Louis Sports Arguments: The 100 Most Controversial, Debatable Questions for Die-Hard Fans, Sourcebooks, 2007
 Madden: A Biography, Triumph Books, 2011

References

External links
 Looking Back-Remembering Sports Columnist Bryan Burwell
 Bryan Burwell brought a different perspective to big sports stories

1955 births
2014 deaths
Deaths from cancer in Missouri
Deaths from melanoma
American sportswriters
American sports radio personalities
National Football League announcers
National Basketball Association broadcasters
African-American sports journalists
American sports journalists
St. Louis Post-Dispatch people
Place of birth missing
Place of death missing
Writers from St. Louis
20th-century American journalists
American male journalists
20th-century African-American people
21st-century African-American people